Events from the year 1863 in Ireland.

Events
2 March – the Ulster Railway, which began construction in 1839, reaches Clones.
10 March – riots in Cork, related to nationalist unrest.
21 August – American clipper Anglo Saxon westbound is captured and burned by Confederate privateer Florida off Old Head of Kinsale.
28 November – first edition of The Irish People.

Arts and literature
Belleek Pottery begins to produce Parian Ware.
Sheridan Le Fanu publishes The House by the Churchyard.
Ellen Bridget O'Connell publishes Derrynane Abbey in 1832, and other Poems.

Births
1 February – George Carew, 4th Baron Carew (died 1926).
11 March – May Guinness, painter (died 1955).
17 March – P. H. McCarthy, labour leader and mayor of San Francisco (died 1933).
31 March – Sir Ion Hamilton Benn, 1st Baronet, businessman and British politician (died 1961).
2 April – Mabel Cahill, tennis player.
9 April – Henry De Vere Stacpoole, ship's doctor and author (died 1951).
12 August – Margaretta Eagar, nurse for the four daughters of Tsar Nicholas II and Tsarina Alexandra and memoirist (died 1936).
25 August – Eugene O'Growney, priest and scholar (died 1899).
7 September – Henry Boyle Townshend Somerville, Royal Navy hydrographic surveyor, murdered by Irish Republican Army (died 1936).
26 September – Caesar Litton Falkiner, Irish Unionist Party politician, barrister, writer and historian (died 1908).
24 November – Frederick Thomas Trouton, physicist responsible for Trouton's Rule (died 1922).
Full date unknown
F. Elrington Ball, author and legal historian (died 1928).
John Mahony, Kerry hurler (died 1943).

Deaths
1 January – Ambrose Madden, recipient of the Victoria Cross for gallantry in 1854 in the Crimea, at Little Inkerman (born 1806).
16 February – Denis Dynon, soldier, recipient of the Victoria Cross for gallantry in 1857 at Chota Behar, India (born 1822).
21 February – Samuel Hill, soldier, recipient of the Victoria Cross for gallantry in 1857 at Lucknow, India, later killed in action (born 1826).
7 July – William Mulready, painter (born 1786).
8 July – Francis Kenrick, headed the Diocese of Philadelphia, then was Archbishop of Baltimore (born 1796).
24 July – Thomas Arthur Bellew, landowner and politician (born 1820).
17 October – John Dunlay, recipient of the Victoria Cross for gallantry in 1857 at Lucknow, India (born 1831).
10 December – James FitzGibbon, British soldier and hero of the War of 1812 (born 1782).
10 December – Charles C. Ingham, painter and founder of New York National Academy of Design (born 1797).

References

 
1860s in Ireland
Years of the 19th century in Ireland
Ireland
 Ireland